Pencader railway station served the village of Pencader, Carmarthenshire, Wales, from 1864 to 1965 on the Carmarthen and Cardigan Railway.

History
The station was opened on 28 March 1864 by the Carmarthen and Cardigan Railway. It was situated at the end of Station Road. The single-storey station building had a booking office and waiting rooms. To the south was a large goods yard to the south which had five sidings, one serving a cattle dock and another serving a goods shed. Also to the south was an engine shed, which was built in January 1866. Initially, there was no signal box but one opened at the south end in September 1894. The engine shed closed on 2 March 1918. The station closed to passengers on 22 February 1965 but remained open for parcel traffic until 6 September 1965. The stationmaster's house is now a private residence.

References

Disused railway stations in Carmarthenshire
Railway stations in Great Britain opened in 1864
Railway stations in Great Britain closed in 1965
1864 establishments in Wales
1965 disestablishments in Wales